Canada A is a national representative rugby union team of Rugby Canada. Previously called Canada Selects, the team is the second-tier side to the Canada national rugby union team. Canada A competes in tournaments such as the Americas Rugby Championship and World Rugby Pacific Challenge against other national 'A' teams.

History
The team first played at Markham, Ontario against the touring Scotland national team in June 2002.

Results
Matches against national teams or national 'A' teams: 
{|style= "table-layout:fixed; width=95%; margin-top:0;margin-left:0;  border-width:1px;border-style:none ;border-color:#ddd; padding:0px; vertical-align:top;" cellpadding=3
|-
 |08-06-2002
| align=right | 
| 33–8
| 
| Markham, ON
|-
 |30-07-2003
| align=right | New Zealand Māori
| 52–11
| 
| Markham, ON
|-
 |11-08-2008
| align=right | 
| 18–34
| 
| Markham, ON
|-
 |21-10-2009
| align=right | 
| 40–16
| 
| Chatham-Kent, ON
|-
 |10-10-2010 || align=right |  || 16–32 ||  ||  Córdoba, Argentina
|-
 |05-10-2010 || align=right |  || 14–49 ||  ||  Córdoba, Argentina
|-
 |15-10-2010 || align=right |  || align=center| 6–17  ||  || Córdoba, Argentina
|-
 |12-10-2012 || align=right |      || 10–28 ||     ||  Langford, BC
|-
 |16-10-2012 || align=right |  || 3–23 ||  ||  Langford, BC
|-
 |19-10-2012 || align=right |  || 28–9 ||  ||  Langford, BC
|-
 |20-10-2013 || align=right |  || 17–10 ||      ||  Langford, BC
|-
 |15-10-2013 || align=right |  || 10–30 ||  ||  Langford, BC
|-
 |19-10-2013 || align=right |  || 14–23 ||  ||  Langford, BC
|-
 |11-10-2014 || align=right |  || 20–6 ||      ||  Langford, BC
|-
 |15-10-2014 || align=right |  || 3–16 ||  ||  Langford, BC
|-
 |19-10-2014 || align=right |  || 9–39 ||  ||  Langford, BC
|-
 |10-03-2015 || align=right |  || 17–69 ||  ||  Suva, Fiji
|-
 |14-03-2015 || align=right |  || 19–17 ||  ||  Suva, Fiji
|-
 |18-03-2015 || align=right | Pampas XV 	   || 36–15 ||  ||  Suva, Fiji
|-
 |23-03-2015 || align=right |  || 26–28 ||  ||  Suva, Fiji

|-
 |08-10-2016 || align=right |  || 56-29 ||  ||  Montevideo, Uruguay
|-
 |12-10-2016 || align=right |  || 47-37 ||  ||  Montevideo, Uruguay
|-
 |16-10-2016 || align=right |  || 27-22 ||  ||  Montevideo, Uruguay
|-
 |07-10-2017 || align=right |  || 71-17 ||  ||  Montevideo, Uruguay
|-
 |11-10-2017 || align=right |  || 31-15 ||  ||  Montevideo, Uruguay
|-
 |15-10-2017 || align=right |  || 45-26 ||  ||  Montevideo, Uruguay
|-
 |06-10-2018 || align=right |  || 35-21 ||  ||  Montevideo, Uruguay
|-
 |10-10-2018 || align=right |  || 45-5 ||  ||  Montevideo, Uruguay
|-
 |14-10-2018 || align=right |  || 31-32 ||  ||  Montevideo, Uruguay
|}

Notes:
 Exhibition match (no cap)

Current squad

On 7 October 2022, a 32-man squad was named ahead of the 2022 World Rugby Americas Rugby Trophy.

'''Head Coach:  Kingsley Jones

References

External links
2014 Pacific Rugby Cup News on oceaniarugby.com

Canada national rugby union team
Second national rugby union teams